Kitchener Centre is a federal electoral district in Ontario, Canada, that has been represented in the House of Commons of Canada since 1997.

Geography
The district includes the north-central and north-eastern parts of the city of Kitchener, Ontario, including the downtown core.

Political geography
In 2008, the race in Kitchener was razor thin between the Conservatives and Liberals. Politically, the riding is split by the Conestoga Parkway. The area to the west of the Parkway tends to support the Liberals while the area to the east of the Parkway tends to vote for the Conservatives. The NDP also won a small handful of polls, scattered around the riding.
In 2019, The Greens saw one of their largest increases as their voteshare jumped up 23% from 3 to 26 percent, and stealing second place from the Conservatives. In terms of voteshare and margin of loss, this was the Green's most successful result in Ontario (even better than neighbouring Guelph, which has a Green MPP) and part of their surge in the South West of the province. In 2021, despite a nationwide vote collapse for the Greens, returning candidate Mike Morrice was able to pull off an upset win, largely helped by the collapse in support for the incumbent Liberal MP, Raj Saini, being involved in sexual assault allgations. This makes Morrice the first ever Green MP from Ontario on the federal level.

Demographics
According to the Canada 2016 Census
Ethnic groups: 81.0% White, 4.1% Black, 2.8% South Asian, 2.2% Indigenous, 2.1% Latin American, 1.9% Southeast Asian, 1.6% Arab, 1.4% Chinese
Languages: 75.4% English, 2.6% German, 1.7% Serbian, 1.7% French, 1.6% Arabic, 1.3% Romanian, 1.2% Portuguese, 1.1% Polish
Religions (2011): 66.1% Christian (27.4% Catholic, 6.3% Lutheran, 5.4% United Church, 4.0% Christian Orthodox, 3.6% Anglican, 3.1% Presbyterian, 2.5% Baptist, 2.2% Pentecostal 11.7% Other), 3.9% Muslim, 1.3% Buddhist, 26.5% None.
Median income: $32,546 (2015) 
Average income: $40,904 (2015)

History

The electoral district was created in 1996 from parts of Kitchener and Kitchener—Waterloo ridings.

It initially consisted of the part of the City of Kitchener bounded on the west by the western limit of the city, on the south by a line drawn from west to east along the Conestoga Parkway, Strasburg Road, Block Line Road, the Canadian Pacific Railway line, and Highway No. 8, on the east by the Grand River, and on the north by a line drawn from east to west along Victoria Street, Lawrence Avenue and Highland Road West.

In 2003, it was redefined to consist of the part of the City of Kitchener bounded on the west by the western limit of the city, on the north by a line drawn from west to east along Highland Road West, Fischer Hallman Road and the Canadian National Railway situated northerly of Shadeland Crescent, on the east by the Grand River, and on the south by a line drawn from east to west along the King Street Bypass (Highway No. 8), King Street East and the Conestoga Parkway.

This riding lost territory to Kitchener—Conestoga and Kitchener South—Hespeler, and gained territory from Kitchener—Waterloo during the 2012 electoral redistribution.

Member of Parliament

This riding has elected the following Member of Parliament:

Election results

See also
 List of Canadian federal electoral districts
 Past Canadian electoral districts

References

Federal riding history from the Library of Parliament
2001 Results from Elections Canada
 Campaign expense data from Elections Canada

Notes

External links
Kitchener Centre NDP Federal Electoral District Association
Kitchener Centre Federal Liberal Electoral District Association
Kitchener Centre Federal PPC Electoral District Association

Ontario federal electoral districts
Politics of Kitchener, Ontario